Hitech may refer to:
high tech, an abbreviation of the term "high technology"
HITECH, the Health Information Technology for Economic and Clinical Health Act (HITECH Act)
HiTech, a late 1980s computer chess machine
Hi-Tech Automotive is a low volume car builder and design house located in Port Elizabeth.
High Technology High School
A genre of music closely related to electronic and psychedelic trance.
Hitech Grand Prix, a racing team